Mariano Egaña Fabres (Santiago, 1793 – Santiago, 1846) was a Chilean lawyer, conservative politician and the main writer of the Chilean Constitution of 1833.

External links

People from Santiago
1793 births
1846 deaths
Chilean scholars of constitutional law